A by-election for the Australian House of Representatives seat of Batman took place on 17 March 2018.

The by-election was called as a result of the resignation on 1 February 2018 of David Feeney, the incumbent backbench Australian Labor Party MP. The ALP candidate, Ged Kearney, won the by-election.

Background

On 6 December 2017, amidst the ongoing citizenship crisis engulfing several MPs, Labor MP David Feeney revealed that he was unable to produce documentation confirming he had renounced citizenship of either the United Kingdom or the Republic of Ireland. Consequently, Feeney voluntarily referred himself to the High Court of Australia, considering his likely breach of Section 44 of the Constitution of Australia. By 19 January 2018, Feeney remained unable to produce any documentary evidence from British or Irish authorities that he took steps to renounce his citizenship and entitlements, and the High Court granted him an extension to 1 February to allow his legal team to continue their search for the relevant documents. At a press conference on 1 February 2018, Feeney announced he would resign from the seat and from politics effective immediately, choosing not to stand as a candidate at the by-election. The date for the by-election was set at 17 March 2018, the same day as the South Australian state election.

The seat was fought by the incumbent Labor Party and the Greens, who received a 9.6% swing towards them in the previous election. Despite finishing first in the primary vote, Greens' candidate Alex Bhathal was defeated by Feeney on the two-candidate-preferred vote 51%-49% at the previous election. Feeney had held the seat for the Labor Party since 2013. It was the sixth time Bhathal had contested the seat, having previously run in 2001, 2004, 2010, 2013 and 2016. The Australian Electoral Commission confirmed that 111,857 people were enrolled to vote in the by-election.

Key dates
Key dates in relation to the by-election are:
 Thursday, 1 February 2018 – Speaker acceptance of resignation 
 Wednesday, 7 February 2018 – Issue of writ
 Wednesday, 14 February 2018 – Close of electoral rolls (8pm)
 Thursday, 22 February 2018 – Close of nominations (12 noon)
 Friday, 23 February 2018 – Declaration of nominations (12 noon)
 Tuesday, 27 February 2018 – Start of early voting
 Saturday, 17 March 2018 – Polling day (8am to 6pm)
 Friday, 30 March 2018 – Last day for receipt of postal votes
 Friday, 18 May 2018 – Last day for return of writs

Candidates
 The Liberal Party declined to field a candidate.

Results

Polling

See also
 List of Australian federal by-elections
 Electoral results for the Division of Batman
 2017 Northcote state by-election

References

External links
 2018 Batman by-election (ABC Elections)

2018 elections in Australia
March 2018 events in Australia
Victorian federal by-elections
2010s in Victoria (Australia)